Kornélia Pongo, née Bárány (born 15 September 1976) is a Hungarian former competitive ice dancer. With András Rosnik, she is the 1996 Ondrej Nepela Memorial champion and the 1998 Hungarian national champion. They competed together at three ISU Championships and four Grand Prix events.

Pongo competed as Kornélia Bárány. She and Rosnik trained mainly in Budapest, coached by Gabriella Remport. Earlier in her career, she competed in partnership with Peter Schreier and Gyula Szombathelyi, appearing at three ISU Championships.

Programs 
(with Rosnik)

Competitive highlights 
GP: Grand Prix

With Rosnik

With Szombathelyi

With Schreier

References 

1976 births
Hungarian female ice dancers
Living people
Figure skaters from Budapest